The Battle of Grumentum was fought in 207 BC between Romans led by Gaius Claudius Nero, and a part of Hannibal's Carthaginian army.  The battle was a minor Roman victory, and Nero marched north where he defeated and killed Hannibal's brother Hasdrubal at Metaurus. The battle is described by Livy at 27.41-42.

References

Grumentum 207 BC
Grumentum 207 BC
Grumentum 207 BC